Snoderån is a  long river on Gotland, Sweden. Snoderån has its source in the Lojsta area and two outflows to the west into the Baltic Sea at Kvarnåkershamn in Sproge and Silte.

References 

Rivers of Gotland County